Turris amicta is a species of sea snail, a marine gastropod mollusk in the family Turridae, the turrids.

Description
The length of the shell varies between 45 mm and 65 mm.

The solid shell has a fusiform shape. The shell is uniform white with a yellowish-olive periostracum. It contains 14-15 whorls, flat-sided and rather deep. The aperture is small with the inside slightly lirate. The short siphonal canal is slightly flexed to the right and recurved. The inner lip is narrow and crenulate at the margin. The left-handed columella is tortuous and suboblique.

This species is remarkable for the numerous subequal keels or spiral lirations, none of them being very large. A double one a little above the middle of the whorls has above and below it a very peculiar style of sculpturing, consisting of a kind of puckering of a very short and oblique thread-like lines.

Distribution
This marine species occurs off Pakistan, India, Sri Lanka; also off Hawaii

References

 Kilburn R.N., Fedosov A.E. & Olivera B.M. (2012) Revision of the genus Turris Batsch, 1789 (Gastropoda: Conoidea: Turridae) with the description of six new species. Zootaxa 3244: 1–58.

amicta
Gastropods described in 1877